Jeffrey Eugene Groth (born July 2, 1957), is a former American football wide receiver in the National Football League for the Miami Dolphins, Houston Oilers, and the New Orleans Saints. Groth was also a 4th round selection of the Texas Rangers as an outfielder in the 1980 MLB Draft.

Groth attended Bowling Green University. In 1978, he played collegiate summer baseball with the Chatham A's of the Cape Cod Baseball League, and was named a league all-star and team MVP.

References

1957 births
Living people
Sportspeople from Mankato, Minnesota
Baseball players from Minnesota
Players of American football from Minnesota
American football wide receivers
Bowling Green Falcons football players
Miami Dolphins players
Houston Oilers players
New Orleans Saints players
Chatham Anglers players